Mount Paterson is a pyramidal nunatak, 690 m in height, standing on the eastern side of the Rockefeller Mountains in Marie Byrd Land, Antarctica.

Important Bird Area
A 172 ha site comprising the ice-free parts of the mountain has been designated an Important Bird Area (IBA) by BirdLife International because it supports an estimated 10,000 breeding pairs of Antarctic petrels, based on a visit made in 1987–88. A small colony of several hundred snow petrels was seen on the steep upper crags of the southernmost peak.

References

 

Important Bird Areas of Antarctica
Seabird colonies
Mountains of Marie Byrd Land